STS-34 was a NASA Space Shuttle mission using Atlantis. It was the 31st shuttle mission overall, and the fifth flight for Atlantis. STS-34 launched from Kennedy Space Center, Florida, on October 18, 1989, and landed at Edwards Air Force Base, California, on October 23, 1989. During the mission, the Jupiter-bound Galileo probe was deployed into space.

Crew

Crew seating arrangements

Mission summary 

Atlantis lifted off from Launch Complex 39B, Kennedy Space Center (KSC), at 12:53:40 EDT on October 18, 1989. It carried the Jupiter-bound Galileo spacecraft in its cargo bay. The countdown was delayed at T-minus 5 minutes for 3 minutes and 40 seconds to update the onboard computer for a change in the Transoceanic Abort Landing (TAL) site. The TAL site was changed from Ben Guerir Air Base, Morocco, to Zaragoza Air Base, Spain, because of heavy rain at Ben Guerir.

The launch was originally targeted for October 12, 1989, the first day of a 41-day launch period during which the planets were properly aligned for a direct flight to Jupiter. The liftoff was rescheduled for October 17, 1989, to replace a faulty main engine controller for Space Shuttle Main Engine No. 2. It was postponed again until October 18, 1989, because of rain-showers within  of Kennedy Space Center's Shuttle Landing Facility. The weather conditions were in violation of the launch commit criteria for a Return To Launch Site (RTLS) landing in the event of an aborted flight.

The primary payload, the Galileo spacecraft with its attached Inertial Upper Stage (IUS), was successfully deployed on its journey to Jupiter. STS-34 was only the second shuttle flight to deploy a planetary spacecraft, the first being STS-30, which deployed the Magellan spacecraft.

Galileo became the first spacecraft to orbit an outer Solar System planet and to penetrate the atmosphere of an outer planet. Also, the spacecraft was scheduled to make the first extended observations of the Jovian system and first direct sampling of Jupiter's atmosphere, as well as the first asteroid flybys.

Several anomalies occurred during the flight, but none had a major impact on the mission. On October 22, 1989, an alarm woke the shuttle crew when the gas generator fuel pump system A heaters on Auxiliary Power Unit (APU) 2 failed to recycle at the upper limits of the system. There were also some minor problems with the Flash Evaporator System for cooling the orbiter, and the cryogenic oxygen manifold valve 2, which was left closed for the rest of the mission. A Hasselblad camera jammed twice, and a spare camera had to be used.

Chang-Díaz described his second flight as much more "subdued". Demonstrators protested at launch time against the flight because it had a nuclear device on board to power the Galileo spacecraft. He also said they almost aborted the flight in orbit three times because of malfunctions, but continued because the alternative was to land with the nuclear device at an airport in Senegal, which could have caused an "international incident", according to the astronaut. He identified the deployment of Galileo as another tricky part of the mission as he only had a tight six-second opportunity to succeed.

On October 21, 1989, Costa Rican President Dr. Óscar Arias talked in Spanish with Chang-Díaz, a native of Costa Rica, and greeted the other crew members via a special telephone linkup. Arias told Chang-Díaz, "You raise high the name of Costa Rica and Latin America in general". Chang-Díaz also explained the mission's objectives in Spanish to Costa Rican listeners on the ground.

Because of high winds predicted at the nominal landing time, the landing was moved two orbits earlier to 12:33:00EDT on October 23, 1989. Atlantis landed on Runway 23 at Edwards Air Force Base, California, after a mission duration of 4days, 23hours, 39minutes, and 20seconds.

Payload and experiments 
The mission's primary task was to deploy the Galileo spacecraft with its attached IUS booster. Deployment occurred on schedule at 19:15 EDT on October 18, 1989, slightly more than six hours after launch, and the IUS successfully boosted Galileo toward Venus on the first leg of its six-year journey to Jupiter. The spacecraft was injected on a Venus transfer orbit at 20:20 EDT, and separated from the IUS 47 minutes later.

Galileo required a triple gravity assist – from Venus, Earth, and then Earth again – to propel it from the inner part of the Solar System to Jupiter in the outer system. The trajectory made it possible to also observe asteroids 951 Gaspra and 243 Ida. Galileo had two major components: an orbiter which examined Jupiter and its four largest moons for eight years, and a probe which descended into the Jovian atmosphere to take direct samplings before being destroyed by the gas giant's heat and pressure.

Besides the Galileo spacecraft, Atlantis''' payload bay held two canisters containing the Shuttle Solar Backscatter Ultraviolet (SSBUV) experiment. SSBUV, which made its first flight on STS-34, was developed by NASA to check the calibration of the ozone sounders on free-flying satellites, and to verify the accuracy of atmospheric ozone and solar irradiance data. The experiment operated successfully.

STS-34 carried a further five mid-deck experiments, all of which were deemed successful, including the Polymer Morphology (PM) experiment, sponsored by the 3M company under a joint endeavor agreement with NASA. The PM experiment was designed to observe the melting and resolidifying of different types of polymers while in orbit. The Mesoscale Lightning Experiment (MLE), which had been flown on previous shuttle missions, observed the visual characteristics of large-scale lightning in the upper atmosphere.

The crew successfully troubleshot a student experiment on ice crystal growth. The experiment's first activation did not produce crystals because the supercooled water formed an ice slag on the cooling plate. The crew turned the experiment off, allowing the ice to thaw, and then redispersed the liquid. Several crystals formed. On October 22, 1989, Lucid and Baker completed the Growth Hormone Concentration and Distribution in Plants experiment by freezing samples of corn seedlings grown in orbit during the mission.

In the cabin, the crew operated an IMAX (70 mm) camera, last flown on STS-29. Werner Herzog's 2005 film The Wild Blue Yonder'' featured footage filmed on the flight.

Chang-Díaz and Baker, a medical doctor, performed a detailed supplementary objective by photographing and videotaping the veins and arteries in the retinal wall of Baker's eyeball to provide detailed measurements which might give clues about a possible relationship between cranial pressure and motion sickness. Baker also tested the effectiveness of anti-motion sickness medication in space.

Wake-up calls 
NASA began a tradition of playing music to astronauts during the Project Gemini, and first used music to wake up a flight crew during Apollo 15. Each track is specially chosen, often by the astronauts' families, and usually has a special meaning to an individual member of the crew, or is applicable to their daily activities.

Gallery

See also 

 List of human spaceflights
 List of Space Shuttle missions

References

External links 
 NASA mission summary 
 STS-34 Video Highlights 

Space Shuttle missions
Edwards Air Force Base
Spacecraft which reentered in 1989
Spacecraft launched in 1989